The Fanglan Mansion is a historical house in Da'an District, Taipei, Taiwan.

History
The mansion was built in 1806 by Chen's family as their first house when they immigrated from Anxi County, Fujian.

Architecture
The mansion was constructed from local stones with fir wood and bricks shipped from Mainland China. A waterwheel attached to one of the exterior wall was decorated with clay moldings. The original layout of the mansion was a traditional three-sectioned structure with left and right wings. Those two wings have since collapsed and no longer exist.

Transportation
The mansion is accessible within walking distance east of Gongguan Station of Taipei Metro.

See also
 List of tourist attractions in Taiwan

References

1806 establishments in Taiwan
Buildings and structures in Taipei
Houses completed in 1806
Houses in Taiwan
Tourist attractions in Taipei